The Replacements were an American rock band formed in Minneapolis, Minnesota, in 1979. Initially a hardcore punk band, they are one of the main pioneers of alternative rock. The band was composed of the guitarist and vocalist Paul Westerberg, guitarist Bob Stinson, bass guitarist Tommy Stinson and drummer Chris Mars for most of its existence. Following several acclaimed albums, including Let It Be and Tim, Bob Stinson was kicked out of the band in 1986, and Slim Dunlap joined as lead guitarist. Steve Foley replaced Mars in 1990. Towards the end of the band's career, Westerberg exerted more control over the creative output. The group disbanded in 1991, with the members eventually pursuing various projects. A reunion was announced on October 3, 2012. Fans affectionately refer to the band as The 'Mats, a nickname that originated as a truncation of "The Placemats," a mispronunciation of their name.

The Replacements' music was influenced by rock artists such as the Rolling Stones, the Beatles, Faces, Big Star, Slade, Badfinger, Creedence Clearwater Revival, and Bob Dylan as well as punk rock bands such as the Ramones, the New York Dolls, the Buzzcocks, the Damned, and the Sex Pistols. Unlike many of their underground contemporaries, the Replacements played "heart-on-the-sleeve" rock songs that combined Westerberg's "raw-throated adolescent howl" with self-deprecating lyrics. The Replacements were a notoriously wayward live act, often performing under the influence of alcohol and playing fragments of covers instead of their own material.

History

Formation and early years (1978–1980)
The Replacements' history began in Minneapolis in 1978, when nineteen-year-old Bob Stinson gave his eleven-year-old brother Tommy Stinson a bass guitar to keep him off the streets. That year Bob met Mars, a high school dropout. With Mars playing guitar and then switching to drums, the trio called themselves "Dogbreath" and began covering songs by Aerosmith, Ted Nugent and Yes without a singer. One day as Westerberg, a janitor in U.S. Senator David Durenberger's office, was walking home from work, he heard a band playing in the Stinsons' house. After being impressed by the band's performance, Westerberg regularly listened in after work. Mars knew Westerberg and invited him over to jam. Westerberg was unaware Mars drummed in Dogbreath.

Dogbreath auditioned several vocalists, including a hippie who read lyrics off a sheet. The band eventually found a vocalist, but Westerberg wanted to be the singer and took him aside one day to say, "The band doesn't like you." The vocalist soon left and Westerberg replaced him. Before Westerberg joined the band, Dogbreath often drank and took various drugs during rehearsals, playing songs as an afterthought. In contrast to the rest of the band, the relatively disciplined Westerberg appeared at rehearsals in neat clothes and insisted on practicing songs until he was happy with them.

"They didn't even know what punk was. They didn't like punk. Chris had hair down to his shoulders," Westerberg told an interviewer. But after the band members discovered first-generation English punk bands like the Clash, the Jam, the Damned and the Buzzcocks, Dogbreath changed its name to the Impediments and played a drunken performance without Tommy Stinson at a church hall gig in June 1980. After being banned from the venue for disorderly behavior, they changed the name to the Replacements. In an unpublished memoir, Mars later explained the band's choice of name: "Like maybe the main act doesn't show, and instead the crowd has to settle for an earful of us dirtbags....It seemed to sit just right with us, accurately describing our collective 'secondary' social esteem".

Demo tape and Twin/Tone Records (1980–1981)
The band soon recorded a four-song demo tape in Mars's basement and handed it to Peter Jesperson in May 1980. Jesperson was the manager of Oar Folkjokeopus, a punk rock record store in Minneapolis, and had also founded Twin/Tone Records with Paul Stark (a local recording engineer) and Charley Hallman. Westerberg originally handed in the tape to see if the band could perform at Jay's Longhorn Bar, a local venue where Jesperson worked as a disc jockey. (The band's first performance at a bar was at the Longhorn on July 2, 1980.) He eavesdropped as Jesperson put in the tape, only to run away as soon as the first song, "Raised in the City", played. Jesperson played the song again and again. "If I've ever had a magic moment in my life, it was popping that tape in", said Jesperson. "I didn't even get through the first song before I thought my head was going to explode".

Jesperson called Westerberg the next day, asking, "So do you want to do a single or an album?" With the agreement of Stark and the rest of the band, the Replacements signed with Twin/Tone Records in 1980. Jesperson's support of the band was welcomed, and they asked him to be their manager after their second show. Later that summer they played at the Longhorn on a Wednesday "New Band Night". They also played several club gigs to almost empty rooms. When they finished a song, apart from the low hum of conversation, the band would hear Jesperson's loud whistle and fast clapping. "His enthusiasm kept us going at times, definitely," Mars later said. "His vision, his faith in the band was a binding force."

After the Replacements signed with Twin/Tone, Westerberg began to write new songs and soon had a whole album's worth of material. Mere weeks after their live debut, the band felt ready to record the album. Jesperson chose Blackberry Way, an eight-track home studio in Minneapolis. However, as the band had no clout there, time spent in the studio was intermittent, and it took about six months to record the album. Although not important at the time, Twin/Tone could not afford to release the album until August 1981. Because they were suspicious of the music business in general, the Replacements had not signed a written contract with Twin/Tone Records.

Early releases (1981–1982)

When the band's first album, Sorry Ma, Forgot to Take Out the Trash, was released in August 1981, it received positive reviews in local fanzines. Option's Blake Gumprecht wrote, "Westerberg has the ability to make you feel like you're right in the car with him, alongside him at the door, drinking from the same bottle." The album contained the band's first single, "I'm in Trouble", Westerberg's "first truly good song". Sorry Ma included the song "Somethin to Dü", a homage to another Minneapolis punk band, Hüsker Dü. The Replacements had a friendly rivalry with the band, which started when Twin/Tone chose the Replacements over Hüsker Dü, and Hüsker Dü landed an opening slot at a Johnny Thunders gig that the Replacements had wanted. Hüsker Dü also influenced the band's music, and the Replacements began playing faster and becoming more influenced by hardcore punk. Despite this, the band did not feel part of the hardcore scene. As Mars later stated, "We were confused about what we were."

Sometime in late 1981, the Replacements played a song called "Kids Don't Follow". Jesperson was convinced the song sounded like a hit and pleaded with the Twin/Tone co-owners Stark and Hallman, "I will do anything to get this out. I will hand-stamp jackets if I have to." The partners agreed to fund the recording, but Jesperson and virtually everyone he knew had to hand-stamp ten thousand white record jackets. The band recorded eight tracks within a week, with Jesperson as producer. Their "balls-to-the-wall hardcore punk attempt", their first EP Stink, containing "Kids Don't Follow" and seven other songs, was released in June 1982, six months after the Chicago show.

The Replacements began to distance themselves from the hardcore punk scene after the release of Stink. "We write songs rather than riffs with statements," Westerberg later stated. Inspired by other rock subgenres, he had been writing songs that incorporated a wide range of musical styles. He even wrote an acoustic ballad, "You're Getting Married One Night", but when he played it to the rest of the band, it was met with silence. "Save that for your solo album, Paul," Bob Stinson said. "That ain't the Replacements". The track remained unreleased for years. Westerberg realized his toughest audience was the band itself, later saying, "If it doesn't rock enough, Bob will scoff at it, and if it isn't catchy enough, Chris won't like it, and if it isn't modern enough, Tommy won't like it."

Hootenanny and Let It Be (1983–1984)

With a batch of new songs, the Replacements entered a warehouse in Roseville, Minnesota, to record their next album, with Twin/Tone co-owner Stark engineering. Westerberg wrote songs in stops and starts, so it took several sessions of recording to finish the album. Stark's meticulous approach to recording contrasted with that of the Replacements, often frustrating the band. In one session, Mars and Westerberg switched instruments, and the band began to improvise, with Westerberg repeatedly shouting, "It's a hootenanny." The band then declared it to be "side one, track one" of the new album. According to Stark, the recording "was a complete joke from their point of view—they did not care what they delivered".

Hootenanny, the band's second studio album, was released in April 1983. Hootenanny saw Westerberg expand his songwriting capabilities, In songs such as "Willpower", with echoed vocals and a sparse arrangement, and "Within Your Reach", which features Westerberg on all instruments, he revealed a more sensitive side. It was a more mature album than Stink and Sorry Ma, Forgot to Take Out the Trash. Hootenanny was played on over two hundred radio stations across the country, with critics acclaiming the album. Robert Christgau, writing in the Village Voice, deemed it "the most critically independent album of 1983".

By Hootenanny's release, the Replacements had begun to attract a following outside of Minneapolis. The band embarked on its first tour of the United States in April 1983, joined by Bill Sullivan, a young security guard, as roadie, who approached the band after a show at the Walker Art Center in Minneapolis. Tommy Stinson dropped out of the tenth grade to join the rest of the band on tour. The Replacements toured venues on the East Coast, including a tense gig at City Gardens, in Trenton, New Jersey, where numerous punks lined the edge of the stage as the band played. The band performed in Detroit, Cleveland and Philadelphia, but its intended destination was New York City, where they played at Gerde's Folk City; they also performed at Maxwell's, in Hoboken, New Jersey.

The Replacements returned to New York in June 1983, playing at CBGB. The gig was a failure; the band were almost refused entry, Bob Stinson was thrown out as soon as he walked in the door, and the Replacements were the last of five bands, which meant they played in the early morning on a Monday night. The show at Folk City was not a success, because "The Replacements were so loud and obnoxious that the people just cleared right out," according to manager Jesperson. The band supported R.E.M. on an eight-date tour later that summer, deciding that they should alienate the audience as much as possible. It was not a successful tour; by the end, various members had threatened to leave the Replacements. Band morale was low, and Westerberg later stated, "We'd much rather play for fifty people who know us than a thousand who don't care."

For the recording of their next studio album, the Replacements decided to return to Blackberry Way Studios in late 1983. The band considered R.E.M.'s guitarist Peter Buck as producer, but when they met him in Athens, Georgia, they did not have enough material to begin recording. Instead, Jesperson and Steve Fjelstad co-produced the album. By this time, the Replacements had grown tired of playing loud and fast exclusively; Westerberg stated, "Now we're softening a little where we can do something that's a little more sincere without being afraid that someone's not going to like it or the punks aren't going to be able to dance to it."

The new material placed more of a focus on songwriting, and the music was influenced by heavy metal, arena rock and Chicago blues. Instruments such as piano, twelve-string guitar and mandolin  were featured throughout the album. The new album included songs such as "I Will Dare", which featured Buck playing lead guitar; "Androgynous", with Westerberg on piano; and "Unsatisfied", in which, according to writer Michael Azerrad, Westerberg "had hit upon a moving new way to declare that he can't get no satisfaction." The band's album Let It Be was released in October 1984 to critical acclaim. Robert Christgau gave the album an A+, and the Seattle Rocket critic Bruce Pavitt called Let It Be "mature diverse rock that could well shoot these regional boys into the national mainstream". In 1989, Let It Be was ranked number 12 on Spin magazine's list of the "25 Greatest Albums of All Time" and number 15 on Rolling Stone magazine's list of the "100 Greatest Albums of the 1980s".

Early major-label releases (1985–1988)
Let It Be attracted the attention of major record labels, and by late 1984 several had expressed an interest in signing the Replacements. Financially, the band was not doing well; they were not selling enough records to recoup their expenses, and money from shows went to recording costs, hotels, travel, food and instrument repairs. Bob Stinson worked a day job as a pizza chef. Twin/Tone was not being paid reliably by distributors, and the sales of Let It Be were not high enough to justify extra promotion. "It was time for a major label to take over," according to the label's co-owner Stark. The band was close to a major-label contract but often alienated label representatives by intentionally performing badly in concert; their 1985 live album, The Shit Hits the Fans, was an example of their concert performances at the time.

One label, the Warner Bros. Records subsidiary Sire Records, eventually signed the Replacements. The band admired the label head, Seymour Stein, who had managed the Ramones, and Stein recruited Tommy Ramone as producer for their first major-label album, Tim, released by Sire in October 1985.

The band spent the remainder of 1985 and the first half of 1986 touring behind Tim. In mid-January 1986 the Replacements received a last-minute request to appear as the musical guests on the edition of January 18 of Saturday Night Live, replacing the scheduled act, the Pointer Sisters, who had been forced to cancel only days before the show. The invitation was partly thanks to the show's musical director of the time, G.E. Smith, who was a Replacements fan but, as a result of their shambolic and profanity-laced performance during the late-night live broadcast, SNL producer Lorne Michaels banned them from ever returning to the show (although Westerberg returned as a solo artist in 1993.) They performed "Kiss Me on the Bus" while completely intoxicated, and after playing an out-of-tune "Bastards of Young" (during which Westerberg audibly called out "Come on fucker" just off-mic) they returned to stage wearing mismatched iterations of each other's clothing. In a 2015 interview recorded for the Archive of American Television, G. E. Smith recalled that although the band had performed well for the early evening pre-taped dress rehearsal performance, one of the band's crew then smuggled alcohol into their dressing room and they spent the next few hours drinking (with the guest host, Harry Dean Stanton) and taking drugs. According to Smith, by the time of the late-night live broadcast they were so intoxicated that on their way to the stage to perform, Bob Stinson tripped in the corridor, fell over onto his guitar and broke it, and Smith had to hurriedly loan him one of the SNL house band's spare instruments.

A few weeks later, on February 4, 1986, the band returned to the New York City area to perform at Maxwell's in Hoboken, New Jersey. That show was professionally recorded by a crew hired by the band's label Sire Records, for use in a possible live album. Over 30 years later, the recordings were finally released as the double album For Sale: Live at Maxwell's 1986.
The tour ended abruptly in June 1986 because Westerberg injured his finger during a show at The Ritz in New York City.

In August 1986, the Replacements either fired Bob Stinson from the band which he had founded, or he chose to leave, or a little of both.  In either case, it was due to creative and personal differences between Stinson and the remainder of the band, aggravated by Stinson's alcohol and drug abuse issues. They also fired Jesperson the same year. "It was like being thrown out of a club that you helped start," Jesperson later commented. "Everybody was drinking and doing more drugs than they needed to."

Bob Stinson preferred the louder, faster style of the band's early music, while Westerberg was exploring new territory in ballads like "Here Comes a Regular" and "Swingin' Party". The remaining Replacements carried on as a trio for Pleased to Meet Me (1987), recorded in Memphis with Big Star producer Jim Dickinson. Minneapolis guitarist Slim Dunlap took over on lead guitar for the subsequent tour and soon became a full member of the band.

Don't Tell a Soul and All Shook Down (1989–1990)
The band's next album, Don't Tell a Soul, was a quieter, less punky affair, largely considered an attempt at mainstream success. While the move cost the Replacements the appreciation of some hardcore fans, the album had some notable songs, such as "Achin' to Be" and "I'll Be You", the latter of which topped the Billboard Modern Rock chart. The band then made a second appearance on network television, on the short-lived ABC program International Rock Awards, for which they performed a typically energetic version of "Talent Show" and caused a minor controversy when Westerberg responded to the network's censoring of the "feeling good from the pills we took" line by inserting an uncensored "It's too late to take pills, here we go" at the end of the song. The band appeared on the cover of Musician magazine in February 1989, in which it was described as "the last, best band of the 80s".

But there was trouble within the band following a disastrous tour opening for Tom Petty and the Heartbreakers. Westerberg recorded a new album largely with session musicians but was persuaded to release it as a Replacements album. All Shook Down won critical praise and more mainstream attention and its debut single "Merry Go Round" again topped the Modern Rock charts. However, the album's many guest players and Mars's quick departure from the band following the album's release led many to wonder about the band's future. They also received a nomination for a Grammy Award for Best Alternative Music Album.

Breakup (1991–2011)
Steve Foley was recruited as Mars's replacement in 1990, and the band toured with Elvis Costello in June 1991, the final show being at Madison Square Garden. The band then embarked on a long farewell tour, which lasted into the summer of 1991. On July 4, 1991, the band played their last show for 22 years, with the Chicago power-pop trio Material Issue at Taste of Chicago in Grant Park, referred to by fans as "It Ain't Over 'Til the Fat Roadie Plays", because each member disappeared during the set, their respective roadies taking their places. This show was broadcast live by the Chicago radio station WXRT. Several bootlegs are available on the Internet.

Bob Stinson, after leaving the Replacements in 1986, played in local Minneapolis bands such as Static Taxi and the Bleeding Hearts. After several years of drug and alcohol abuse, he died in 1995, at the age of 35. Tommy Stinson quickly followed his time in the Replacements with the short-lived bands Bash & Pop and Perfect. He was the bass guitarist for Guns N' Roses beginning in 1998, replacing Duff McKagan from the band's "classic lineup" until leaving the band in 2016. In 2004, he released a solo CD, Village Gorilla Head, followed in 2011 by One Man Mutiny.

Westerberg is a successful singer-songwriter signed to Vagrant Records and, under his alias Grandpaboy, to Fat Possum Records. His album Folker was released in September 2004, marking a return to the melodic low-fi of the Replacements. Dunlap kept a low national profile but remained active in the Twin Cities music scene until suffering a massive stroke in 2012, which left him without the ability to move or eat. Mars primarily works as a visual artist.

In 1997, Reprise Records released the two CD set All for Nothing / Nothing for All. The All for Nothing disc collected cuts from Tim through All Shook Down; the Nothing for All disc is a collection of B-sides and tracks not previously released on albums.

In 2002, in an interview with Rolling Stone, Westerberg mentioned that the Replacements had been considering a reunion. He said, "We'll get together again one day. It will take a while, or it might take a few legal swipes of the pen, but we ain't over." A partial reunion nearly occurred in March 2002, when Tommy Stinson planned to join Westerberg on a tour of the Midwest, but Stinson's prior commitments with Guns N' Roses prevented it from happening.

On June 13, 2006, Rhino Records released the compilation album Don't You Know Who I Think I Was?, consisting of songs from the Twin/Tone and Sire-Reprise years and including two new songs, "Pool & Dive" and "Message to the Boys". The new songs were written by Westerberg and recorded by the band (Westerberg, Tommy Stinson and Mars) at Flowers Studio in Minneapolis. Session musician Josh Freese (the Vandals, ex-A Perfect Circle, ex-Guns N' Roses) played drums on the two tracks; Mars contributed backing vocals. Neither Slim Dunlap nor Steve Foley participated in the sessions.

On April 22, 2008, Rhino released remastered deluxe editions of the band's four Twin/Tone albums with rare bonus tracks. On September 24, 2008, Rhino similarly released the four Sire albums in deluxe editions. Material recorded with Tom Waits in 1988 was released on the Westerberg solo album 3oclockreep in 2008.

Foley died in 2008 from an accidental overdose of a prescription medication.

Reunion (2012–2015)

On October 3, 2012, it was announced that the Replacements had re-formed and that Westerberg and Tommy Stinson were in the studio recording an EP containing song cover versions. Titled Songs for Slim, the EP was sold in a 250-copy edition of 10" vinyl and auctioned online to benefit former bandmate Dunlap, who had suffered a stroke.

In November 2012, the documentary filmmaker Gorman Bechard released Color Me Obsessed, a film which tells the band's story through the eyes of their most ardent fans.

The Replacements played their first shows in 22 years at Riot Fest in Toronto (August 24 and 25, 2013), Chicago (September 13–15) and Denver (September 21 and 22). Dave Minehan, guitarist and vocalist of the Boston-based band the Neighborhoods, and drummer Josh Freese rounded out the lineup for these shows. Westerberg has said that the band does not rule out touring or recording a new album. The band played two sets at the Coachella Valley Music and Arts Festival, on April 11 and 18, 2014; Green Day front man Billie Joe Armstrong joined the band onstage on the second date. The band was also announced as one of the headliners of the September 2014 Boston Calling Music Festival, along with Lorde and the National. On September 9, 2014, the Replacements appeared as the musical guest on The Tonight Show, performing "Alex Chilton". On September 19, 2014, they played at Forest Hills Stadium. Monsoon rains cancelled the Summer Ends Music Festival in Tempe, Arizona, on September 27, 2014, resulting in their only indoor show of the tour when it was moved to the Marquee Theatre.

On December 17, 2014, a 24-minute jazz improvisation track entitled "Poke Me in My Cage" was uploaded to the band's SoundCloud account.

On February 9, 2015, the band announced a spring tour of the United States. On this tour, they debuted a new song called "Whole Foods Blues", and according to their co-manager Darren Hill, the band has "laid down seven or eight" for a possible new album. Towards the end of the tour, two shows in Columbus and Pittsburgh were initially postponed for medical reasons, but were subsequently cancelled outright. The Replacements performed for the first time in Spain and Portugal at the Primavera Sound festival on May 28, 2015, and June 5, 2015, respectively, as part of a brief European tour. On June 5, 2015, Westerberg announced onstage at the Primavera Sound festival in Porto, Portugal, that it was the band's final show. T-shirts Westerberg had worn to previous shows had hinted at this outcome: each shirt had two letters on it (one each on front and back), ultimately spelling out, "I have always loved you. Now I must whore my past."

In a September 2015 interview, Stinson discussed the band working on new studio material, stating, "it was one of those things: We dipped our toe in the water, and it didn't feel so good." Stinson stated that he had reworked songs he wrote for the Replacements as material for his solo career.

Live performances
The Replacements gained local notoriety following their first live performance, because of Tommy Stinson's young age. Early shows were consistently tight and became more aggressive following the release of the Stink EP in 1982. As their stylistic repertoire began to expand with the writing and recording of Hootenanny the following year, the band's increasingly antagonistic stage show left them with a reputation for their rowdy, often drunken live shows. The band frequently went on stage too intoxicated to play. They were famously banned permanently from Saturday Night Live after performing drunk before a national television audience on January 18, 1986. As one reviewer succinctly observed, the band could quite often be "mouthing profanities into the camera, stumbling into each other, falling down, dropping their instruments, and generally behaving like the apathetic drunks they were." There emerged an element of unpredictability, as The Replacements—when sober—gained critical praise for their live shows. Part of the mystique of The Replacements was the fact that the audience never knew until the start of a concert if the band would be sober enough to play. It was not uncommon for the group to play entire sets of cover versions, ranging anywhere from Bryan Adams's "Summer of '69" to Dusty Springfield's "The Look of Love" to Led Zeppelin's "Black Dog."

Legacy

The band has been honored with a star on the outside mural of the Minneapolis nightclub First Avenue, recognizing performers that have played sold-out shows or have otherwise demonstrated a major contribution to the culture at the iconic venue. Receiving a star "might be the most prestigious public honor an artist can receive in Minneapolis," according to journalist Steve Marsh. Westerberg also has a star for his solo work, making him one of the few musicians to be honored with multiple stars on the mural.

The Goo Goo Dolls' vocalist and guitarist Johnny Rzeznik cites Paul Westerberg as an "obvious influence" on his music. The Goo Goo Dolls toured in support for The Replacements' final tour. They also co-wrote the song "We Are the Normal" with Westerberg for their 1993 album Superstar Car Wash. Members of The Cribs have cited The Replacements as a key influence. Members of the alternative country groups Uncle Tupelo and Whiskeytown have said that The Replacements were an important influence on them. Brian Fallon of Gaslight Anthem said in a 2009 interview that "without The Replacements, there would be no Gaslight Anthem" and that they were inspired by the song "Left of the Dial". The band They Might Be Giants made a tribute song to them called "We're The Replacements".

Film director Derek Wayne Johnson has stated in interviews that The Replacements are his favorite band of all-time.

1234 Go! Records released We'll Inherit the Earth: A Tribute to The Replacements on October 3, 2006. The album contains twenty-three covers of The Replacements songs by various rock, punk, pop and country artists.

On October 16, 2013, the band was announced as one of the 2014 Rock and Roll Hall of Fame nominees, but they were not inducted.

"Alex Chilton" appears as a playable song in Harmonix's music videogame Rock Band 2 for all consoles. "Kids Don't Follow" was also released for the game as downloadable content.

Indie rock band Art Brut released a song titled "The Replacements" on their third album (Art Brut vs. Satan), in which singer Eddie Argos expresses both appreciation for the band, and incredulousness over the fact he was not already familiar with their music.

Their songs have been used in many feature films. "Treatment Bound" was used in the official soundtrack for Jackass Number Two. The 1998 teen comedy film Can't Hardly Wait is named after their single, and the song itself plays over the end credits. The song "I Will Dare" is sung by Keanu Reeves and Cameron Diaz in the car in Feeling Minnesota. Lou and Nick contemplate their lives and the possibility of changing the past in the 2010 comedy Hot Tub Time Machine while "I Will Dare" plays in the background. "I'll Be You" plays during Jerry's bachelor party in the 1996 romantic comedy-drama sports film Jerry Maguire. The 2009 Greg Mottola film, Adventureland, opens with "Bastards of Young". The song "Unsatisfied" is also used in the film during the bus ride to New York. The song was also featured in the 1994 film Airheads and the 2016 film Ordinary World. The fictional band the Fingers, in the movie Losers Take All, gets its big break by securing a gig opening for The Replacements. "Within Your Reach" was used in the 1989 film Say Anything. "Here Comes a Regular" was on the episode "Rigby's Graduation Day Special" on Cartoon Network's Regular Show. "Here Comes a Regular" was on the episode "The Wind That Blew My Heart Away" on One Tree Hill. Peyton's mother describes the song as "the happiest" and it is heard playing in the episode. Here Comes A Regular also appeared in the final episode of the Netflix series 13 Reasons Why.

In what could be considered the only case of The Replacements somewhat receiving any official recording industry accolades, the band's biographist Bob Mehr received the Best Album Notes trophy at the 63rd Annual Grammy Awards in 2021 for his liner notes on the 2019 box set Dead Man's Pop, which is in itself an anniversary reissue of their 1989 album Don't Tell a Soul.

Members
 Paul Westerberg – lead vocals, guitar (1979–1991, 2006, 2012–2015)
 Tommy Stinson – bass guitar (1979–1991, 2006, 2012–2015)
 Bob Stinson – lead guitar (1979–1986; died 1995)
 Slim Dunlap – lead guitar (1987–1991)
 Chris Mars – drums (1979–1990), backing vocals (2006)
 Steve Foley – drums (1990–1991; died 2008)

Touring musicians
 Josh Freese – drums (2006, 2012–2015)
 Dave Minehan – guitars (2012–2015)

Timeline

Discography

 Sorry Ma, Forgot to Take Out the Trash (Twin/Tone) (1981)
 Hootenanny (Twin/Tone) (1983)
 Let It Be (Twin/Tone) (1984)
 Tim (Sire) (1985)
 Pleased to Meet Me (Sire) (1987)
 Don't Tell a Soul  (Sire) (1989)
 All Shook Down (Sire) (1990)

Suggested reading

Suggested viewing
 Color Me Obsessed - A Film About The Replacements (dir. Gordon Bechard and Paul Westerberg) (2011) - Documentary

References

Notes

Bibliography

External links

 
 Twin Tone Records (audio and video)
 City Pages – This Is Hardcore
 The Replacements database
 The Skyway, a long-running Replacements internet fanzine
 
 

Alternative rock groups from Minnesota
College rock musical groups
Punk rock groups from Minnesota
American post-punk music groups
American power pop groups
Musical groups established in 1979
Musical groups disestablished in 1991
Musical groups reestablished in 2012
Hardcore punk groups from Minnesota
Sire Records artists
Glass Records artists
Grammy Award winners
Musical groups disestablished in 2015
Sibling musical groups
1979 establishments in Minnesota
American melodic hardcore musical groups